The Scottish Parliamentary Corporate Body (SPCB) is a body of the Scottish Parliament responsible for the administration of the parliament. It also has a role in provision of services to commissioners and other statutory appointments made by the parliament.

Role

The SPCB is established by section 21 of, and schedule 2 to, the Scotland Act 1998, but it was left to the Scottish Parliament to decide how the SPCB operates. The SPCB considers and makes decisions on a wide range of issues to do with the running of the parliament including the property, staff and resources that the parliament requires in order to operate. The corporate body administers the resources of the parliament as well as the budget of the parliament. It also considers the use of parliamentary facilities and is responsible for the staffing and security of the parliament.

Members

The SPCB is convened by the Presiding Officer of the Scottish Parliament and at least four other MSPs.

Each member of the body takes on a specific portfolio.

Office holders

The Scottish Parliament is responsible for the appointment of several statutory positions for commissioners and senior public appointments. The parliament nominates individuals to the monarch, who formally appoints them to a post.

This includes the following posts:
 The Auditor General for Scotland
 The Scottish Public Services Ombudsman
 The Scottish Information Commissioner
 Scotland's Commissioner for Children and Young People
 The chair of the Scottish Human Rights Commission

The SPCB provides the budget for each of the above with the exception of the Auditor General for Scotland, which is considered directly by parliament. 

The SPCB is responsible for nominating the following posts to parliament:
 Commissioner for Ethical Standards in Public Life in Scotland
 members of the Scottish Human Rights Commission
 The Standards Commission for Scotland
 Clerk of the Scottish Parliament

See also
Member of the Scottish Parliament
Scottish Parliament Building
Scotland Act 1998
House of Commons Commission, a comparable committee of the British House of Commons

References

External links
Official website

 
1999 establishments in Scotland
Government agencies established in 1999